The Ligue Professionelle 2 is the second football level in Tunisia, under Ligue Professionelle 1 which is the top level of Tunisian football. Contested by 24 clubs, divided in two groups, playing each other twice during the season, the top two teams are promoted at the end of the season, whilst the bottom two teams are relegated to the Ligue Professionnelle 3.

During the past few years the name of the competition has changed several times, with the league being known as Division d'honneur (Honor division). National B, Ligue 2 and Championnat de la Ligue Professionnelle 2

Organization and management
The organization and management of the Tunisian Ligue Professionnelle 2 are assigned to the Professional Football League, which awards the title of Tunisia's Ligue 2 champion to the club whose team finishes at the top of the rankings at the end of the last day of the competition. 
It is the Organising Committee for Competitions (which also organizes matches in Ligue 1), which ensures the organization and the approval of matches.
The Ligue 2 clubs participate in the Tunisian Cup with Ligue 1 and Ligue 3 clubs.

2022–23 clubs

Group A
AS Gabes
CS Bembla
AS Marsa
AS Oued Ellil
ES Radès
CO Médenine
CS Korba
JS Kairouan
ES Jerba
Espoir Rogba
AS Mohamdia
Jendouba Sport

Group B
Croissant Sportif de M'saken
Kalâa Sport
ES Zarzis
EGS Gafsa
El Makarem de Mahdia
CS Hammam-Lif
AS Djerba 
Jeunesse Sportive El Omrane
Sporting Club Moknine
Stade Gabesien
Sporting Ben Arous
Stade Sportif Sfaxien

Promotion and relegation by season

Previous winners

External links
 Tunisian FA
 Tunisian Ligue 2 - Hailoosport.com (Arabic)
 Tunisian Ligue 2 - Hailoosport.com 

I
 
2
Sports leagues established in 1921
1921 establishments in Tunisia
Second level football leagues in Africa